Mars Lasar is a German-born keyboardist and composer, raised in Australia. Predominantly new-age, his music also contains elements of electronica, jazz, pop, world, and rock. Lasar's music has appeared on television and in films; one notable example is music from his first album, Olympus, being used for CBS's coverage of the Olympic Games in Albertville, France in 1992. He has worked with other artists including Seal, Herbie Hancock, Jon Stevens, John Sykes, and t.A.T.u. Many of his album covers feature his own artwork.

In 2019, Mars released the second of his 8-minute MindScapes series.

Early life 
When Lasar was eleven, he began to learn piano, and was trained extensively in jazz and classical. It was his mother, who was a classical artist from Germany, that ignited a love for music in him. Lasar has been interested in technology as long as he can remember. Using a stopwatch, a cassette player, and a shortwave radio, he demonstrated multi-track sequencing before it was ever invented.

His mother was also partly the reason for his interest in art, and he began hanging his original oil paintings around his high school in the 80's.

When Lasar was fifteen, he received the "Young Composers Award" sponsored by the Sydney Opera House. It was at this age that he discovered his interest in blending music and technology which soon led him into working and composing for the President of Fairlight Computers.

He was discovered by Fairlight while being a part of a band of members who loved music, mathematics, and technology equally. As a band in the late 70's and early 80's, they used synthesizers, monophonic sequencers, drum machines, and vocals and would dress up in spacesuits when they performed.

Career 
His work with the Fairlight CMI was extensive, and he recalls, "I spent countless hours building the first sample library. I composed many compositions using my sequencing method which was sent out to the world with the machines at $80,000 a piece. I demonstrated the Fairlight to many artists and producers including Alan Parsons, Kate Bush, Duran Duran, Herbie Hancock and many others at that time."

Due to his work with Fairlight CMI, Mars attracted much attention and went on to create compositions for companies, such as Kleenex, Duracell, and Chrysler. In addition, he created compositions for television, such as Equal Justice and Baywatch, and the NFL.

His early experience scoring movies came from his project with Sounds Like Australia (1987), a wildlife movie that required him to rework the sounds of Australian wildlife into music.

In the following years, Lasar worked with Hans Zimmer on the movie, Days of Thunder, starring Tom Cruise. Shortly after, Lasar was asked to help with composing an album with Seal, a new artist at the time. That album earned a Grammy nomination.

Lasar released his first solo album in 1991 and now has over 30 solo albums as well as a collection of collaborative projects. Mars' music has been featured in shows such as Conviction (NBC), 24 (Fox), America's Got Talent, Extreme Makeover, The Bachelor, and others.

Discography

Meditation and MindScapes Series

Solo Piano

Motivational

Nature Series

World Series

Chilled Electronic & Eleventh Hour Series

New Age

Electronica

Holiday

Babyscape and Baby Escape Series

Compilations

References

External links 
 www.marslasar.com
 www.realmusic.com
 www.sonicimages.com
 Mars' Trip
 Music catalog

New-age musicians
Living people
Year of birth missing (living people)